Chalton Windmill is a Grade II listed tower mill on the top of Windmill Hill at Chalton, Hampshire, England, which has been converted to residential use.

History
A mill has been recorded on the site since 1289. A windmill was marked on John Norden's map dated 1607, John Speed's map dated 1611, Joan Blaeu's map dated 1645 and John Ogilby's map dated 1675. The Chalton mill was built in the early nineteenth century. In the 1950s it was threatened with demolition but a preservation order was placed on the mill by the local council. Circa 1978 permission was given for the mill to be incorporated into a new-build house. The converted mill was awarded a Certificate of Merit by the Petersfield Society.

Description

Chalton windmill is a four-storey tower mill. It had four patent sails carried on a cast-iron windshaft and the cap was winded by a fantail. The millstones were driven overdrift.

References

External links
 Windmill World webpage on Chalton windmill
 Photograph of the derelict mill c. 1964

Windmills in Hampshire
Tower mills in the United Kingdom
Grinding mills in the United Kingdom
Grade II listed buildings in Hampshire
Grade II listed windmills